"How R U Doin?" is a song by Danish-Norwegian pop group Aqua from their third studio album, Megalomania. It was released as the album's lead single on 14 March 2011. The song peaked at number four in Denmark, becoming the group's tenth top-ten single. It has since been certified gold by the International Federation of the Phonographic Industry (IFPI) for sales of 15,000 copies.

Background and composition
On 9 March 2011 Aqua posted the single artwork to "How R U Doin?" on their Facebook page with the date "14.03.2011".

The Europop song was written by Søren Rasted, Claus Norreen, and Thomas Troelsen. The song serves as the first single from their third studio album, Megalomania, which was released on 3 October 2011.

Music video
The music video starts off with Søren, René, Lene, and Claus walking towards the camera with the words 'How R U Doin?' appearing on-screen in-beat with the music. René and Lene are then driving white trucks throughout a dirty, post-apocalyptic environment with Søren and Claus as passengers, respectively.  After doing jumps, maneuvering through explosions, and crashing into various objects, the group walks away from the trucks - away from the camera - with the words 'How R U Doin?' appearing on-screen one last time.

Track listing
Digital download
 "How R U Doin?" – 3:21

Digital download  — remixes
 "How R U Doin?" (Freisig & Dif Remix) – 5:26
 "How R U Doin?" (Club Mix) – 6:01

Certifications

Certifications

Release history

References

2011 singles
Aqua (band) songs
Songs written by Søren Rasted
Songs written by Thomas Troelsen
Songs written by Claus Norreen
2011 songs